Edran is a Belgian automobile manufacturer. The company was founded in 1984 by André Hanjoul. The first car to be displayed in public was the Edran Spyder MK I at the 1994 Brussels Motor Show. In 2006, the company introduced its newest sports car, the Edran Enigma.

Spider Mk I
The body is made of fiberglass, carbon fiber, and Kevlar, giving a total weight of 710 kg.

Enigma
It has a top speed of 340 km/h (211 mph). The body and chassis are made of carbon fiber and Kevlar, giving the Enigma a total weight of 1,240 kg.

See also
List of automobile manufacturers
List of car brands
List of Western European automobile manufacturers

References

External links
The Edran Spyder
The Edran Enigma
Official website

Car manufacturers of Belgium